The Wood Demon (1889) is a comedic play in four acts by Anton Chekhov. 

Written in September and October 1889, it was totally reworked in December, and premiered on December 27, 1889 at the private Abramova Theatre in Moscow. This second version of The Wood Demon was completed in April 1890 and received the permission to be staged by Imperial Theatres in May. It was published by the Rassokhin Publishers on 23 August 1890. 

The play was first refused by the Alexandrinsky Theatre of Saint Petersburg and the Maly Theatre of Moscow.

Eight years after this play failed, Chekhov returned to the work. He reduced the cast list by half, changed the climactic suicide into an anti-climax of a failed homicide, and published the reworked play, much more successfully, under the title Uncle Vanya.

Characters
 Alexander Serebryakov, a retired professor
 Helena, his wife of 27 years old
 Sofia Alexandrovna (Sonya), his daughter from his first marriage, 20 years old
 Mary V. Wynn, widow of a privy councilor, the mother of the first wife of professor
 Egor P. Wynn, her son
 Leonid S. Zheltukhin, not after taking a technologist, a very rich man
 Julia Stepanovna, his sister, 18 years old
 Ivan Orlov, a landowner
 Fedor, his son
 Michael L. Khrushchev, a landowner, he graduated at the Faculty of Medicine
 Ilya Ilyich Dyadin
 Basil servant Zheltukhina
 Simon, an employee at the mill

Themes
A dominant theme in The Wood Demon is that destruction of the environment and of people's lives are closely linked together.

History
The play was initially a collaboration between Chekhov and Alexey Suvorin. As such, it is full of biographical material collected during their time spent together in the summer of 1888. The play is linked with stories already written or in the process of being written, that stemmed from Chekhov's journey in 1887 to Kharkov and Taganrog.

Reception
The failure of The Wood Demon was one of the motivations for Chekhov's journey through Siberia and why he abstained from writing a play for the next seven years after which he rose to fame
.

References

Plays by Anton Chekhov
1889 plays